Cold Inferno is the fifth full-length studio album by the Italian melodic death metal band Disarmonia Mundi, and was released on June 9, 2015.

Track listing
 "Creation Dirge" – 5:28
 "Stormghost" – 4:24
 "Behind Closed Doors" – 3:16
 "Coffin" – 4:01
 "Oddities from the Ravishing Chasm" – 7:20
 "Slaves to the Illusion of Life" – 3:35
 "Blessing from Below" – 4:45
 "Magma Diver" – 3:55
 "Clay of Hate" – 4:11
 "Toys of Acceleration" – 4:49
 "The Loneliness of the Long Distance Runner (feat. Christian Älvestam) (Iron Maiden cover) (Japanese Bonus Track)" – 6:22

Personnel

Disarmonia Mundi
 Ettore Rigotti – guitar, bass guitar, drums, keyboards, clean vocals
 Claudio Ravinale − death vocals, lyrics
 Björn "Speed" Strid – vocals

Additionnel personnel

Musical Guests
Christian Älvestam - co-vocals (11)

External links
 New album information

Disarmonia Mundi albums
2015 albums